Abu Tarek is the brother of Osbat al-Ansar leader Ahmed Abd al-Karim al-Saadi (Abu Mohjen). It is widely assumed that Tarek has been in control of Osbat al-Ansar after his brother went into hiding following a death sentence from the Lebanese government.

References

Year of birth missing (living people)
Living people
Palestinian militant commanders
Palestinian Sunni Muslims
Place of birth missing (living people)